The Force Essex is a British Television programme documenting the work of Essex Police.

References

Sky UK original programming
Documentary television series about policing
English-language television shows